Rothenbrunnen railway station is a station in Cazis, Switzerland. It is located on the  gauge Landquart–Thusis line of the Rhaetian Railway. It serves the nearby municipality of Rothenbrunnen.

Services
The following services stop at Rothenbrunnen:

 Chur S-Bahn : hourly service between Thusis and Chur.

References

External links
 
 

Railway stations in Graubünden
Rhaetian Railway stations
Railway stations in Switzerland opened in 1896